James Gourlay is a British conductor.

James or Jimmy Gourlay may also refer to:

James Gourlay (footballer, born 1860) (1860–1939), Scottish international footballer in 1888, father of Jimmy Gourlay
James Gourlay (footballer, born 1862) (1862–1926), Scottish international footballer in 1886
Jimmy Gourlay (1888–1970), Scottish footballer (Everton FC and Greenock Morton FC), son